Yttrium iodide is a binary inorganic compound, a salt of yttrium and hydroiodic acid with the formula . The compound forms colorless crystals, soluble in water.

Synthesis
1. Heating yttrium and iodine in an inert atmosphere:
 2Y + 3I2 -> 2YI3   

2. Heating yttrium oxide with ammonium iodide:
 Y2O3 + 6NH4I -> 2YI3 + 6NH3 + 3H2O 

It can also be obtained by reacting yttrium oxide or yttrium hydroxide with hydroiodic acid.

Physical properties
Yttrium iodide forms colorless flaky crystals. The crystal structure is that of the  structure type.

It dissolves well in water and ethanol. Does not dissolve in diethyl ether.

It also occurs as a tri- and hexahydrate.

Applications
A precursor for YBCO superconducting materials in a lower temperature preparation.

References

Yttrium compounds
Iodides